The 2017 NCAA Division II baseball tournament decided the champion of baseball in NCAA Division II for the 2017 season. The  claimed their second national title, their first being in 2012. The Tritons were also in their second final, having also been the national runners up in 2010. West Chester pitcher Josh McClain was named the tournament's most outstanding player.

Regionals

Atlantic Regional–Jamestown, New York
Hosted by Mercyhurst at Russell Diethrick Park.

Central Regional–Emporia, Kansas
Hosted by Emporia State at Trusler Sports Complex.

East Regional–Manchester, New Hampshire
Hosted by Southern New Hampshire at Gill Stadium.

Midwest Regional–Midland, Michigan
Hosted by Northwood at Gerace Stadium.

South Regional–Cleveland, Mississippi
Hosted by Delta State at Ferriss Field.

Southeast Regional–Mount Olive, North Carolina
Hosted by Mount Olive at Scarborough Field.

South Central Regional–San Angelo, Texas
Hosted by Angelo State at Foster Field.

West Region–Azusa, California
Hosted by Azusa Pacific at Cougar Baseball Field.

College World Series

Participants

Results

Bracket
All Games Played at AirHogs Stadium in Grand Prairie, Texas

Game results

References

 
NCAA Division II Baseball Tournament
NCAA Division II baseball tournament